James Reid (born 18 November 1879 – 1976) was a Scottish footballer. An inside-forward, he played for Petershill, Hibernian, Port Vale, West Ham United, Gainsborough Trinity, Worksop Town, Notts County, Watford, Tottenham Hotspur, Reading, and New Brompton. He played in the Scottish Football League First Division, the Football League (both the First Division and Second Division), the Southern League, the Midland League, and the Western League.

Career
Reid played his early football with Petershill, before moving on to First Division club Hibernian. He made his scoring debut for "Hibs" on 3 September 1898, in a 4–1 win at Partick Thistle. He went on to score three goals in eight league and cup appearances in 1898–99.

Reid left Easter Road and moved south of the border to sign with Second Division side Port Vale in July 1899. He scored his first goal in the Football League in a 1–0 win over Walsall at Fellows Park on 21 October. He scored five goals in 25 appearances in the 1899–1900 season, before coming down with an injury in December 1899.

He left the Athletic Ground in the summer to join Arnold Hills's young West Ham United side. He scored five goals in 13 Southern League games in the 1900–01 season. In 1901, he joined Gainsborough Trinity, who would finish bottom of the Second Division in 1901–02. He moved on to Worksop Town of the Midland League, and then signed with Notts County in May 1903. The "Magpies" finished 13th in the First Division in 1903–04, and then last in 1904–05.

Reid joined Southern League side Watford in 1905, and finished as the club's top-scorer in 1905–06 with 15 league and cup goals, including a run of scoring in six consecutive games. He joined Tottenham Hotspur of the Western League in 1906, and finished as the club's top-scorer in 1906–07 with 21 goals. He later represented Southern League clubs Reading and New Brompton. He married a woman from Gainsborough and went on to work at a factory in the town.

Career statistics
Source:

References

1879 births
1976 deaths
Footballers from Bellshill
Scottish footballers
Association football inside forwards
Petershill F.C. players
Hibernian F.C. players
Port Vale F.C. players
West Ham United F.C. players
Gainsborough Trinity F.C. players
Worksop Town F.C. players
Notts County F.C. players
Watford F.C. players
Tottenham Hotspur F.C. players
Reading F.C. players
Gillingham F.C. players
Scottish Football League players
English Football League players
Southern Football League players
Midland Football League players
Western Football League players